Borovik is a surname.

Borovik may also refer to:

Borovik (rural locality), Russia
, village in Croatia
, village in Croatia
, an artificial lake at the Vuka river, Croatia

See also